Cylindroiulus punctatus, commonly known as the blunt-tailed snake millipede, is a species of millipede in the family Julidae. It was described by Leach in 1815 and can be found in western Europe, including Great Britain. It has been introduced in North America.

Description and habitat
The species are brown, have 100 legs and move slowly. They are punctuated, but its difficult to spot the dots. It can be found on trees, just under the bark. They live a long time and it takes them three years to reach sexual maturity.

References

Julida
Animals described in 1815
Millipedes of Europe
Millipedes of North America
Taxa named by William Elford Leach